Daniel Strož (born 4 August 1943 in Plzeň) is a Czech politician and former Member of the European Parliament for the Communist Party of Bohemia and Moravia; part of the European United Left–Nordic Green Left party group in the European Parliament.

References 

1943 births
Living people
Politicians from Plzeň
Communist Party of Bohemia and Moravia MEPs
MEPs for the Czech Republic 2004–2009